Infinite Loop is a non-fiction book on the history of Apple Inc., written by Michael S. Malone and published by Doubleday Business in 1999. The book is named after Infinite Loop (street), where the company had its headquarters, which were located in the middle of Silicon Valley, at 1 Infinite Loop, Cupertino, California.

References

1999 non-fiction books
Books about Apple Inc.